Samuel Aaron Goldstein (12 June 1852 – 29 May 1935) was a New Zealand rabbi, scholar and community leader in Auckland, New Zealand. He was born on 12 June 1852.

In 1935, he was awarded the King George V Silver Jubilee Medal.

References

1852 births
1935 deaths
New Zealand rabbis
Religious leaders from Auckland
New Zealand Jews
English emigrants to New Zealand
English rabbis